Jiří Králík (born 11 April 1952 in Gottwaldov, Czechoslovakia) is a retired professional ice hockey goaltender who played in the Czechoslovak Extraliga.  He played for HC Jihlava.  He was a member of the Czechoslovak 1981 Canada Cup teams and was a silver medalist at the 1984 Winter Olympics. And at the 1982 and 1985 International Ice Hockey Championship he was named as a first  team all star.

External links
Olympics database page

1952 births
Czech ice hockey goaltenders
Czechoslovak ice hockey goaltenders
Sportspeople from Zlín
Olympic ice hockey players of Czechoslovakia
Ice hockey players at the 1980 Winter Olympics
Ice hockey players at the 1984 Winter Olympics
Olympic silver medalists for Czechoslovakia
Living people
Olympic medalists in ice hockey
Medalists at the 1984 Winter Olympics
PSG Berani Zlín players
HC Dukla Jihlava players
Czechoslovak expatriate sportspeople in West Germany
Czechoslovak expatriate ice hockey people
Expatriate ice hockey players in West Germany